The Minuteman Bikeway is a 10-mile (16-kilometre) paved multi-use rail trail located in the Greater Boston area of Massachusetts. It runs from Bedford to Alewife station, at the northern end of the Red Line in Cambridge, passing through the towns of Lexington and Arlington along the way. Also along the route are several notable regional sites, including Alewife Brook Reservation, the Cyrus Dallin Art Museum, Spy Pond, "Arlington’s Great Meadows" (actually located in Lexington), the Battle Green in Lexington, and Hanscom Air Force Base.

At its Cambridge terminus, the bikeway connects with four other bike paths: 
the Fitchburg Cutoff Path 
the Cambridge Linear Park which, in turn, leads to the Somerville Community Path. 
the Alewife Brook Greenway, a connection to the Mystic River bike path, following Alewife Brook. The Alewife Brook extension received $4M from the American Recovery and Reinvestment Act of 2009 as the "Minuteman Bikepath Connector" project.
 a sidewalk path to Fresh Pond Reservation and the Watertown Cambridge Greenway

Plans are underway to extend the Somerville Community Path to downtown Boston, which would create a much larger continuous bikeway accessible from the Minuteman.

At the Bedford end, the Minuteman Bikeway connects with the Narrow Gauge Rail Trail and the Reformatory Branch Rail Trail.

History 

The path comprising the current Minuteman Bikeway has a long history. The trail closely approximates the route that Paul Revere took on his famous ride in 1775, which heralded the beginning of the American Revolution.

Along the way to becoming a railroad, the path's right-of-way was laid out east of Lexington in 1846 by the Lexington and West Cambridge Railroad and west of Lexington in 1873 by the Middlesex Central Railroad. Part of the original track can be seen in Arlington, near Uncle Sam Plaza in front of the Cyrus Dallin Art Museum.

Railbanking of the line was first proposed in 1974, three years before passenger rail service was discontinued, and a full seven years before rail service was discontinued altogether (in 1981). In 1991, the final plan for the conversion was approved, and construction started on the original section of the bikeway. The Arlington–Lexington section of the path was dedicated in September 1992; the Lexington–Bedford segment was delayed by water main construction and opened in May 1993. In 1998, the bikeway was extended a short distance from East Arlington to Alewife station in Cambridge. 

In 2002, it was repaved in Arlington and in 2004, the Bedford Depot Park Enhancement Project was completed at its western terminus. In 2008, the bikeway was the fifth inductee into the national Rail-Trail Hall of Fame by the Rails-to-Trails Conservancy.

The property is currently owned by the Massachusetts Bay Transportation Authority and leased to the municipalities through which it passes on an interim basis. The MBTA at one point planned to use this right-of-way to extend the Red Line to Arlington Center and Arlington Heights.

Beginning in Spring 2015, the crossing of the path through Arlington Center is expected to be rebuilt to be less discontinuous.

Uses
Area residents use the bikeway for a host of activities, including bicycling, walking, jogging, and inline skating. The main use of the path, however, is for casual biking. In the winter there is often enough snow on the bikeway for cross-country skiing.  However, it is now plowed from Alewife Station to Bedford. No motorized vehicles are allowed except for powered wheelchairs and emergency vehicles.

Future possibilities

New connections under contemplation include one from Lexington to the Battle Road Trail and one to the Charles River bike path via Fresh Pond Reservation and the abandoned Watertown Branch Railroad. A portion of the latter path, at the Watertown end, has been completed and design work on the remaining section to Cambridge is expected to be finished in 2016.

In April 2014, state officials announced that the Somerville Community Path would be extended alongside the Green Line Extension, creating a continuous 4.5 mile route from the Minuteman Bikeway to Boston’s Charles River Bike Path. Officials had contemplated abandoning the path portion of the GLX in order to save costs, but after hiring new management, a contractor agreed to the parallel path while still cutting costs.

Gallery of views along the bikeway

See also
Minutemen
Uncle Sam Memorial Statue

References

External links

Minuteman Bikeway - official website
Minuteman Commuter Bikeway | Rails-to-Trails Conservancy
Video | Virtual cycling video of the Minuteman Bikeway (2012)
Video | "The Minuteman Trail, America’s 500th Rail" (1993)
Friends of Lexington Bikeways
Railroad maps from the 1870s show the right-of-way of what now the Minuteman Bikeway 

Bike paths in Massachusetts
Rail trails in Massachusetts
Transportation in Cambridge, Massachusetts
Lexington, Massachusetts
Bedford, Massachusetts
Arlington, Massachusetts
Bay Circuit Trail
Tourist attractions in Cambridge, Massachusetts